William Huddleston (died 1628) was an English Member of Parliament.

He was the eldest son of Anthony Huddleston of Millom, Cumberland.

He  was elected a knight of the shire (MP) to the Parliament of England for Cumberland in 1601 and was appointed High Sheriff of Cumberland for 1617–18.

He died in 1628 and was buried in Millom church. He had married Mary Bridges of Gloucestershire and had 7 sons and 8 daughters.

References

16th-century births
1628 deaths
English MPs 1601
High Sheriffs of Cumberland